Darreh Shah Nazar (also Romanized as Darreh Shāh Naz̧ar and Darreh-ye Shāh Naz̧ar) is a village in Tudeshk Rural District, Kuhpayeh District, Isfahan County, Isfahan Province, Iran. At the 2006 census, its population was 32, in 9 families.

References 

Populated places in Isfahan County